Robert Morrison, D.D. (March 15, 1822 – July 27, 1902) was an American Presbyterian minister, teacher and editor who was the principal founder of the Phi Delta Theta international college fraternity, suggesting the fraternity's creation and co-authoring the fraternity document known as The Bond.

Morrison grew up in Ohio and entered Ohio University in 1839 as a scholarship student.  He attended Ohio University for two years, returning home to help on the family farm and to teach school.  He entered Miami University in 1846 and conceived the idea for the Phi Delta Theta fraternity, which he founded with five other students on December 26, 1848.  He later attended McCormick Theological Seminary and Princeton Theological Seminary.

Morrison's career as a minister, editor of religious publications and teacher took him to Tennessee, Kentucky, Ohio and Missouri. He edited the Louisville Presbyterian Herald from 1854 to 1860. He was also co-editor of the Louisville True Presbyterian, which was suppressed by Union military authorities in 1863, during the American Civil War.

In September 1869, Morrison established Westminster Academy, a co-educational school in Waterford, Ohio, where he was principal for six years. He was also the principal of Poplar Grove Academy in Rutherford County, Tennessee. He combined his teaching duties with regular preaching. From 1879 to 1881 he worked as financial agent to eliminate the debts of Westminster College and established the Phi Delta Theta Missouri Beta Chapter, in Fulton, Missouri. After this he preached at various locations around Missouri, and founded churches in towns such as Gravois Mills and Tuscumbia.

Miami University conferred a Doctor of Divinity on him in 1897.

Morrison died at his home near Fulton, Missouri in 1902, second to last survivor of the six founders of Phi Delta Theta. The fraternity paid off Morrison's mortgage and provided an endowment to his widow.

References

External links

Presbyterian Churches of Churches of Miller County: Tuscumbia Presbyterian Church

1822 births
1902 deaths
American educators
American Presbyterian ministers
19th-century Presbyterian ministers
Editors of Kentucky newspapers
Ohio University alumni
Miami University alumni
McCormick Theological Seminary alumni
Princeton Theological Seminary alumni
College fraternity founders
Phi Delta Theta
19th-century American clergy